Isla San Ildefonso, is an island in the Gulf of California east of the Baja California Peninsula. The island is uninhabited and is part of the Mulegé Municipality.

Biology
Isla San Ildefonso has four species of reptile: Coluber flagellum (coachwhip), Phyllodactylus nocticolus (peninsular leaf-toed gecko), Sceloporus orcutti (granite spiny lizard), and Uta stansburiana (common side-blotched lizard).

References

Further reading

Islands of Baja California Sur
Islands of the Gulf of California
Uninhabited islands of Mexico